Richard "Dick" E. Norberg was a professor of physics at Washington University in St. Louis. His research focused on nuclear magnetic resonance (NMR).

Biography 
Norberg grew up in Evanston, Illinois, studied at DePauw University, and earned his bachelor's degree in absentia in 1943 while serving in the United States Air Force in World War II. After returning in 1946, he received his master's and doctoral degrees in physics from the University of Illinois at Urbana-Champaign in 1947 and 1951, respectively, as the first Ph.D. student of Charles Slichter. He joined the physics department at Washington University in St. Louis in 1954 to work for George Pake. He was quickly hired as a professor, and served as department chair from 1962–1991. He retired in 1993 from teaching and worked part-time until 2003. Over the course of his career he advised 47 Ph.D. students.  He made many contributions to NMR.

He was married and had three children.

Awards 

 Fellow, American Physical Society, 1957
 Alfred P. Sloan Fellow, 1955-1957
 ISMAR Prize from International Society of Magnetic Resonance, 2004

References 

1922 births
2010 deaths
Washington University physicists
Washington University in St. Louis faculty
American physicists
Fellows of the American Physical Society
United States Army Air Forces personnel of World War II